Lignite is a ghost town in Botetourt County, Virginia, United States. A former lignite mining town owned by Allegheny Ore and Iron Company (which later became a subsidiary of Lukens Steel Company in 1907, it contained a company store, churches, school, post office, and a main street theater. It was abandoned by the company in the 1920s after ore demands dropped, when higher grade coal was discovered in Pennsylvania, but some people continued to live in the houses until the 1950s. It has very few remains and is now a part of the Jefferson National Forest.

References
 http://www.ghosttowns.com/states/va/lignite.html
 http://www.waymarking.com/waymarks/WM2EJJ
 https://www.blueridgeoutdoors.com/magazine/february-2012/lost-town-of-lignite/
Jones, Allie Sloss, Amid the Great Valley: Oriskany, Oriskany Press, 2002.
"New Life for a Long-Ago Town", New Castle Record, Mar. 29, 1995.

Geography of Botetourt County, Virginia
Ghost towns in Virginia